The men's 68 kg  competition in taekwondo at the 2004 Summer Olympics in Athens took place on August 27 at the Faliro Coastal Zone Olympic Complex.

Iran's Hadi Saei secured a tight 4–3 victory over Chinese Taipei's Huang Chih-hsiung to pick up the Olympic gold medal in the event, adding it to his bronze from Sydney four years earlier. Meanwhile, South Korean taekwondo fighter Song Myeong-seob edged his worthy adversary Diogo Silva of Brazil 12–7 to score a bronze.

Competition format
The main bracket consisted of a single elimination tournament, culminating in the gold medal match. The taekwondo fighters eliminated in earlier rounds by the two finalists of the main bracket advanced directly to the repechage tournament. These matches determined the bronze medal winner for the event.

Schedule
All times are Greece Standard Time (UTC+2)

Results
Legend
PTG — Won by points gap
KO — Won by knockout
SUP — Won by superiority
OT — Won on over time (Golden Point)
WO — Walkover

Main bracket

Repechage

References

External links
Official Report

Men's 068 kg
Men's events at the 2004 Summer Olympics